The 2020 WNBA season was the 22nd season for the Connecticut Sun franchise of the Women's National Basketball Association. It will also be the 18th season for the franchise in Connecticut. The season tipped off on July 26, 2020, versus the Minnesota Lynx.

This WNBA season was originally going to feature an all-time high 36 regular-season games. However, the plan for expanded games was put on hold on April 3, when the WNBA postponed its season due to the COVID-19 pandemic. Under a plan approved on June 15, the league held a shortened 22-game regular season at IMG Academy, without fans present, which started on July 24.

The Sun's season started slowly when the team lost its first five games.  They recovered to win four of their next five and were 4–7 at the season's halfway mark.  The Sun won six of the next nine to secure a playoff spot with two games to go in the season. The Sun last the final two games of the season to finish 10–12.  That earned them the seventh seed in the playoffs.

As the seventh seed, the Sun played in the First Round against the sixth seeded Chicago Sky.  The Sun won the game 94–81 and advanced to the Second Round.  There they faced off against the third seed Los Angeles Sparks.  Again, they triumphed as underdogs, this time 73–59.  The win saw them advance to the Semifinals, where they matched up against the first seed Las Vegas Aces.  The Sun won games one and three of the best-of-five series, but could not close out games four or five, and lost the series 2–3 to end their season.

WNBA Draft

Trades/Roster Changes

Current roster

Game log

Regular season

|- style="background:#fcc;"
| 1
| July 26
| Minnesota Lynx
| L 69–77
| A. Thomas (20)
| Tied (8)
| Tied (4)
| IMG Academy0
| 0–1
|- style="background:#fcc;"
| 2
| July 28
| Washington Mystics
| 89–94
| Bonner (29)
| A. Thomas (11)
| Bonner (5)
| IMG Academy0
| 0–2
|- style="background:#fcc;"
| 3
| July 30
| Los Angeles Sparks
| L 76–81
| Bonner (34)
| A. Thomas (18)
| A. Thomas (8)
| IMG Academy0
| 0–3

|- style="background:#fcc;"
| 4
| August 1
| Minnesota Lynx
| L 69–78
| Bonner (28)
| Tied (7)
| J. Thomas (4)
| IMG Academy0
| 0–4
|- style="background:#fcc;"
| 5
| August 4
| Seattle Storm
| L 74–87
| Jones (20)
| A. Thomas (13)
| Hiedeman (5)
| IMG Academy0
| 0–5
|- style="background:#bbffbb;"
| 6
| August 6
| Dallas Wings
| W 91–68
| Jones (17)
| A. Thomas (10)
| J. Thomas (9)
| IMG Academy0
| 1–5
|- style="background:#fcc;"
| 7
| August 8
| Chicago Sky
| L 93–100
| J. Thomas (22)
| A. Thomas (6)
| J. Thomas (6)
| IMG Academy0
| 1–6
|- style="background:#bbffbb;"
| 8
| August 10
| Atlanta Dream
| W 93–82
| A. Thomas (21)
| Bonner (9)
| J. Thomas (7)
| IMG Academy0
| 2–6
|- style="background:#bbffbb;"
| 9
| August 12
| Dallas Wings
| W 70–66
| Bonner (18)
| A. Thomas (7)
| Tied (4)
| IMG Academy0
| 3–6
|- style="background:#bbffbb;"
| 10
| August 14
| Chicago Sky
| W 77–74
| Bonner (19)
| A. Thomas (10)
| A. Thomas (8)
| IMG Academy0
| 4–6
|- style="background:#fcc;"
| 11
| August 16
| Seattle Storm
| L 72–95
| J. Thomas (17)
| Jones (11)
| A. Thomas (6)
| IMG Academy0
| 4–7
|- style="background:#bbffbb;"
| 12
| August 18
| Indiana Fever
| W 84–62
| Bonner (28)
| A. Thomas (11)
| Tied (6)
| IMG Academy0
| 5–7
|- style="background:#fcc;"
| 13
| August 20
| Las Vegas Aces
| 78–99
| Tied (15)
| A. Thomas (7)
| A. Thomas (7)
| IMG Academy0
| 5–8
|- style="background:#bbffbb;"
| 14
| August 22
| New York Liberty
| W 82–65
| A. Thomas (25)
| Bonner (12)
| Bonner (6)
| IMG Academy0
| 6–8
|- style="background:#fcc;"
| 15
| August 28
| Los Angeles Sparks
| W 80–76
| A. Thomas (19)
| A. Thomas (9)
| J. Thomas (6)
| IMG Academy0
| 6–9
|- style="background:#bbffbb;"
| 16
| August 30
| Washington Mystics
| W 76–63
| Bonner (20)
| Tied (11)
| A. Thomas (8)
| IMG Academy0
| 7–9

|- style="background:#bbffbb;"
| 17
| September 1
| New York Liberty
| W 70–65
| Bonner (27)
| Bonner (12)
| A. Thomas (4)
| IMG Academy0
| 8–9
|- style="background:#fcc;"
| 18
| September 3
| Las Vegas Aces
| L 78–93
| Bonner (22)
| Mompremier (16)
| January (5)
| IMG Academy0
| 8–10
|- style="background:#bbffbb;"
| 19
| September 5
| Indiana Fever
| W 96–77
| Bonner (22)
| 3 tied (6)
| J. Thomas (7)
| IMG Academy0
| 9–10
|- style="background:#bbffbb;"
| 20
| September 7
| Phoenix Mercury
| W 85–70
| Bonner (25)
| A. Thomas (9)
| A. Thomas (9)
| IMG Academy0
| 10–10
|- style="background:#fcc;"
| 21
| September 9
| Phoenix Mercury
| L 95–100
| Bonner (32)
| A. Thomas (17)
| A. Thomas (5)
| IMG Academy0
| 10–11
|- style="background:#fcc;"
| 22
| September 11
| Atlanta Dream
| L 75–82
| Bonner (17)
| A. Thomas (9)
| Hiedeman (4)
| IMG Academy0
| 10–12

Playoffs 

|- style="background:#bbffbb;"
| 1
| September 15
| Chicago Sky
| W 94–81
| A. Thomas (28)
| A. Thomas (13)
| A. Thomas (8)
| IMG Academy
| 1–0

|- style="background:#bbffbb;"
| 1
| September 17
| Los Angeles Sparks
| 73–59
| A. Thomas (19)
| Bonner (13)
| J. Thomas (6)
| IMG Academy
| 1–0

|- style="background:#bbffbb;"
| 1
| September 20
| Las Vegas Aces
| W 87–62
| J. Thomas (31)
| Bonner (8)
| A. Thomas (5)
| IMG Academy
| 1–0
|- style="background:#fcc;"
| 2
| September 22
| Las Vegas Aces
| L 75–83
| Bonner (23)
| Mompremier (9)
| J. Thomas (4)
| IMG Academy
| 1–1
|- style="background:#bbffbb;"
| 3
| September 24
| Las Vegas Aces
| W 77–68
| A. Thomas (23)
| A. Thomas (12)
| J. Thomas (6)
| IMG Academy
| 2–1
|- style="background:#fcc;"
| 4
| September 27
| Las Vegas Aces
| L 75–84
| J. Thomas (25)
| Bonner (15)
| J. Thomas (6)
| IMG Academy
| 2–2
|- style="background:#fcc;"
| 5
| September 29
| Las Vegas Aces
| L 63–66
| A. Thomas (22)
| Jones (12)
| Bonner (6)
| IMG Academy
| 2–3

Standings

Playoffs

Statistics

Regular season

Awards and honors

References

External links

Connecticut Sun at ESPN.com

Connecticut Sun seasons
Events in Uncasville, Connecticut
Connecticut
Connecticut Sun